Sharon L. Pace (born November 20, 1943) is an American politician. She was a member of the Missouri House of Representatives, having served from 2009 to 2016. She is a member of the Democratic Party.

Electoral history

State Representative

State Senate

References

1943 births
Living people
Politicians from St. Louis
Women state legislators in Missouri
Democratic Party members of the Missouri House of Representatives
21st-century American politicians
21st-century American women politicians